Arnoglossum ovatum, the ovateleaf cacalia, is a species of plant in the sunflower family. It is native to the southeastern and south-central United States from southern North Carolina to Florida and eastern Texas.

Arnoglossum ovatum is a large plant growing up to 300 cm (120 inches or 10 feet) tall. Flower heads are small but numerous, usually white or pale green, occasionally slightly purplish. The species grows in sandy woods, savannahs, and roadsides.

References

External links
Lady Bird Johnson Wildflower Center, University of Texas
Southeastern Flora
Alabama Plant Atlas
Wildflowers of Texas

Senecioneae
Flora of the Southern United States
Plants described in 1788